Intracellular bacteria are bacteria, which have the capability to enter and survive within the cells of the host organism. Many of them are capable of growth extracellularly, but some of them can grow and reproduce only intracellularly (obligate intracellular parasites). Besides bacteria, there are other kinds of intracellular microorganisms.

Examples of non-obligate intracellular bacteria include members of the genera Brucella, Legionella, Listeria, and Mycobacterium. Examples of obligate intracellular bacteria include members of the order Rickettsiales and members of the genus Mycoplasma.

See also 
 Endosymbiont

References 

Bacteria
Microbiology
 
Cells